Óscar Pimentel González (born 21 May 1955) is a Mexican politician affiliated with the Institutional Revolutionary Party. As of 2014 he served as Deputy of the LV and LIX Legislatures of the Mexican Congress representing Coahuila.

See also 
 1999, Coahuila state election
 List of presidents of Saltillo Municipality

References

1955 births
Living people
Politicians from San Pedro, Coahuila
Institutional Revolutionary Party politicians
Deputies of the LIX Legislature of Mexico
Members of the Chamber of Deputies (Mexico) for Coahuila